Whithorn is the closed terminus of the Wigtownshire Railway branch, from Newton Stewart, of the Portpatrick and Wigtownshire Joint Railway.  It served the town of Whithorn in Wigtownshire.  The line was closed to passenger services in 1950, and to goods in 1964.

Other stations 

 Newton Stewart - junction
 Wigtown
 Kirkinner
 Whauphill
 Sorbie
 Millisle - junction
 Garlieston
 Whithorn

See also 

 List of closed railway stations in Britain

References

External links
 Disused stations

Disused railway stations in Dumfries and Galloway
Former Portpatrick and Wigtownshire Joint Railway stations
Railway stations in Great Britain opened in 1877
Railway stations in Great Britain closed in 1950
Whithorn